Lam Pho is one of the eight subdistricts (tambon) of Bang Bua Thong District, in Nonthaburi Province, Thailand. Neighbouring subdistricts are (clockwise from north) Khlong Khoi and Lahan. In 2020 it had a total population of 13,094 people.

Administration

Central administration
The subdistrict is subdivided into 8 administrative villages (muban).

Local administration
The whole area of the subdistrict is covered by Lam Pho Subdistrict Administrative Organization.

References

External links
Website of Lam Pho Subdistrict Administrative Organization

Tambon of Nonthaburi province
Populated places in Nonthaburi province